A metope is the space between two triglyphs of a Doric frieze.

Metope may also refer to:

 Metope (mythology), a river nymph in Greek mythology
 Metope (producer), electronic music producer Michael Schwanen
 Métopes Op.29, a piano work by Karol Szymanowski

See also
 Metopes of the Parthenon, notably on the Parthenon